Senator Harriman may refer to:

Phil Harriman (born 1955), Maine State Senate
Walter Harriman (politician) (1817–1884), New Hampshire State Senate